Summer in the City is the first full-length feature film by director Wim Wenders, released in 1970 and starring Hanns Zischler.

Wenders' first full-length film was produced as his graduation project at the University of Television and Film Munich ("Hochschule für Fernsehen und Film München") which he attended from 1967 to 1970. Shot in 16 mm black and white by long-time Wenders collaborator Robby Müller, the movie exhibited many of Wenders' later trademark themes of aimless searching, running from invisible demons, and persistent wandering toward an indeterminate goal. In this case the journey is that of protagonist Hans (Zischler) after he is released from prison. Searching through seedy West German streets and bars, he finally winds up visiting an old friend in Berlin.

According to Wenders, the title of the film relates to the song from the band The Lovin' Spoonful, which was also included in the film, although a painting by Edward Hopper may have influenced Wenders as well. Wenders, an admirer of both The Lovin' Spoonful and Hopper, has included references to them in several of his films.

References

External links
 Official Website
 

1970 films
1970s drama road movies
German black-and-white films
Films directed by Wim Wenders
Films produced by Wim Wenders
Films set in Munich
Films set in Berlin
1970s German-language films
German drama road movies
Student films
West German films
1970 directorial debut films
1970 drama films
1970s German films